Carlos Renan Bloise Serra known as Carlos Renan (born February 12, 1983 in Rio de Janeiro) is a retired Brazilian footballer who played as a defender in Brazil and manager.

Career
Formed in basic categories of Flamengo, where ran seven departures by professional team in between 2002 and 2004. Carlos Renan also served in other clubs of Rio de Janeiro, is Serrano, Duque de Caxias and Portuguesa da Ilha. In Bangu, then defender ended up being the highlight of the alvirrubro during the 2010 Campeonato Carioca was soon negotiated with the Portuguese football, but not adapted and ended up returning the Bangu in second half of 2011 to re-edit their good performances in the Copa Rio and thus the carreirra of player. The same Bangu started as coach, initially being assistant coach and in August 2015, going to be hired as coach.

Titles
 Flamengo
 Campeonato Carioca: 2004
 Taça Guanabara: 2004

 Zagłębie Lubin
 Ekstraklasa: 2006–07

Notes

1983 births
Living people
Footballers from Rio de Janeiro (city)
Brazilian footballers
Brazilian football managers
CR Flamengo footballers
Serrano Football Club players
Zagłębie Lubin players
Duque de Caxias Futebol Clube players
Associação Atlética Portuguesa (RJ) players
Bangu Atlético Clube players
F.C. Paços de Ferreira players
Bangu Atlético Clube managers
Ekstraklasa players
Association football defenders